Rustam Rasulovich Inoyatov (born 22 June 1944) is a former Uzbek government official, as well as a colonel general. He was head of the National Security Service of Uzbekistan (SNB) from 1995 until his dismissal in January 2018. He was said to have been part of the Tashkent clan, a powerful faction within the Uzbek elite. He was said to be one of the most powerful men in the country.

Biography 
Rustam Rasulovich Inoyatov was born in the city of Sherabad, Surkhandarya region. His father – Rasul Inoyatov, KGB colonel.

From 1965 to 1967 he worked as a concrete worker in the Tashkent Building Trust, at the same time he studied at the university. In 1968 he graduated from the Faculty of Iranian Philology of the Tashkent State University.

After graduation, he served in the ranks of the Soviet army. During military service, he was accepted into the service of the KGB of the USSR. Worked in various officer positions in the KGB of the Uzbek SSR, in The First Chief Directorate of the KGB.

In 1976-1981, he was a case officer in Afghanistan under diplomatic cover.

Since June 27, 1995 – Chairman of the National Security Service of the Republic of Uzbekistan. Previously, he served as First Deputy Chairman  of the Department.

In 1996 he was awarded the rank of "lieutenant general", in 1999 – "colonel general".

From 1999 to 2020, Inoyatov was the President of the Tennis Federation of Uzbekistan.

On January 31, 2018, Rustam Inoyatov was relieved of the post of Chairman of the National Security Service of the Republic of Uzbekistan and appointed to the position of State Advisor to the President of the Republic of Uzbekistan. November 15, 2021 he was relieved of this position.

Rustam Inoyatov is considered one of the most influential people in Uzbekistan — the "demiurge" of Uzbek politics.

Rise to power

In 1995, the President of Uzbekistan, Islam Karimov, gave him the position of chief of the SNB as a counter weight to his rival's power, Zokir Almatov, the Minister of Internal Affairs. Under Inoyatov's leadership, the SNB rose to power over the rival MVD of Almatov. By 1999, they had more power and funding than the MVD.

He is widely thought to be the kingmaker when Islam Karimov died.

Inoyatov was dismissed by Shavkat Mirziyoyev on January 31, 2018. On November 15, 2021, he was relieved of his post as State Advisor to the President of the Republic of Uzbekistan.

References

Living people
1944 births
Uzbekistani politicians
KGB officers
Uzbekistani military personnel